Walk on the Wild Side may refer to:
 A Walk on the Wild Side, a 1956 novel by Nelson Algren
 Walk on the Wild Side (film), a 1962 film adapted from Algren's novel
 "Walk on the Wild Side" the title song of the 1962 film, by Mack David & Elmer Bernstein
 "Walk on the Wild Side" a 1972 Lou Reed song
 Walk on the Wild Side: The Best of Lou Reed, an album
 Walk on the Wild Side (TV series), a 2009 UK comedy sketch show
 Walk on the Wild Side, a British TV documentary produced by Daniel Abineri

See also
Take a Walk on the Wildside, a 2017 Canadian documentary